Mohammad Rana Miah is a first-class and List A cricketer from Bangladesh.  He was born on 8 October 1979 in Lamabazar, Sylhet and played as a right-handed batsman and occasional bowler for Sylhet Division between 2001/02 and 2005/06. He made three first-class fifties, with a best of 74 against Dhaka Division and took 2 for 13 on one occasion against Chittagong Division.

References

Bangladeshi cricketers
Sylhet Division cricketers
Living people
1979 births